Barrancas may refer to:
 Barrancas, Neuquén, Argentina
 Barrancas, Pichilemu, Chile
 Barrancas, La Guajira, Colombia
 Barrancas del Orinoco, Venezuela
 Barrancas metro station, in Santiago, Chile
 Barrancas River, in Argentina
 Fort Barrancas, Pensacola, Florida, United States

See also 
 Barranca (disambiguation)